Bucknill may refer to:

Sir John Alexander Strachey Bucknill, KC British lawyer and colonial judge (and son of Thomas Townsend Bucknill).
Sir John Charles Bucknill, English psychiatrist and mental health reformer.
Sir Thomas Townsend Bucknill MP QC was an English, Member of Parliament and Privy Councillor (and son of John Charles Bucknill).